Mike Murei (born 15 March 1950) is a Kenyan hurdler. He competed in the men's 400 metres hurdles at the 1972 Summer Olympics.

References

1950 births
Living people
Athletes (track and field) at the 1972 Summer Olympics
Kenyan male hurdlers
Olympic athletes of Kenya
Place of birth missing (living people)